Alessandro Calvi (born 1 February 1983) is a freestyle swimmer from Voghera, Italy, who was a member of team that won the silver medal in the men's 4×100 metres freestyle relay at the 2007 World Championships. He represented his native country at the 2004 Summer Olympics in Athens, Greece.

References
 Profile

1983 births
Living people
Italian male swimmers
Swimmers at the 2004 Summer Olympics
Swimmers at the 2008 Summer Olympics
Olympic swimmers of Italy
People from Voghera
Italian male freestyle swimmers
World Aquatics Championships medalists in swimming
Medalists at the FINA World Swimming Championships (25 m)
European Aquatics Championships medalists in swimming
Universiade medalists in swimming
Mediterranean Games silver medalists for Italy
Mediterranean Games medalists in swimming
Swimmers at the 2009 Mediterranean Games
Universiade gold medalists for Italy
Universiade bronze medalists for Italy
Swimmers of Centro Sportivo Carabinieri
Medalists at the 2005 Summer Universiade
Sportspeople from the Province of Pavia